44 Inch Chest is a 2009 British crime comedy-drama film directed by Malcolm Venville in his directorial debut. The film stars Ray Winstone, Ian McShane, John Hurt, Tom Wilkinson, Stephen Dillane and Joanne Whalley. The film was released on 19 October 2009.

It was originally written for the stage in 1996 by Louis Mellis and David Scinto, who went on to write Sexy Beast before the script was adapted for film in 2009. The film was produced by Richard Brown and Steve Golin (Babel, Eternal Sunshine of the Spotless Mind), and featured cinematography by Daniel Landin. The score is a collaboration between Angelo Badalamenti and Massive Attack.

Plot

Colin Diamond is a successful car salesman who, after discovering his wife Liz is having an affair, has an emotional breakdown. His friends convince him to kidnap his wife's lover and then encourage him to torture and kill him.

Diamond's partners in crime are suave homosexual gambler Meredith, crotchety and bigoted Old Man Peanut, the down to earth Archie and the combustible Mal, who by turns encourage Colin's lust for revenge and sympathise with his situation, and conspire to emotionally and mentally torture Liz's new boyfriend, Loverboy, a "Frog" waiter, first by locking him in a cupboard and threatening him, and tying him up and subjecting him to humiliating verbal and physical assault.

Parts of the story occur in flashback, with Colin discovering Liz's infidelity and the after effects of it, which then affect the present, in which he tries to come to terms with the shame and torment that this brings to him. Parts of the story also appear to happen inside Colin's mind, with him trying to reconcile with himself, using his friends as representations of his own turmoil, and his resolving of the situation.

Cast
 Ray Winstone as Colin Diamond
 Ian McShane as Meredith
 John Hurt as Old Man Peanut
 Tom Wilkinson as Archie
 Stephen Dillane as Mal
 Joanne Whalley as Liz Diamond
 Melvil Poupaud as Loverboy
 Steven Berkoff as Tippi Gordon
 Edna Doré as Archie’s Mother
 Andy de la Tour as Biggy Walpole
 Derek Lea as Bumface
 Ramon Christian as Boy on Sofa

Production
44 Inch Chest is set and filmed in Borehamwood, Hertfordshire, and London, England on 26 May and 13 July 2008.

Reception
44 Inch Chest has received mixed reviews. Review aggregate Rotten Tomatoes reports that 41% of critics have given the film a positive review based on 81 reviews, with an average score of 5.2/10. The critics consensus reads, "An actor's movie with a strong cast, 44 Inch Chest can't quite redeem its static plotting and tonal shifts." The Daily Telegraph gave the film 3/5 stars, calling the film "A plum actors' piece which both gains and loses points by soberly stalling its own plot." Peter Bradshaw of The Guardian was less enthusiastic, giving the film 2/5 saying "The film talks the talk – in fact, it talks and talks and talks the talk. But the walk isn't happening."

Home media
On 10 May 2010, the DVD was released in Region 2 in the United Kingdom; it was distributed by Momentum Pictures. Image Entertainment purchased American distribution rights months before the film's festival premiere; they released the Region 1 DVD on April 20, 2010.

Adaptations
From 12–24 August 2019, 44 Inch Chest will be performed on stage for the first time as part of the Edinburgh Festival Fringe, at the Perth Theatre (aka theSpace on North Bridge). The play, an abridged edit of the original 1996 script, will be produced by Out of Bounds Theatre.

See also
 Gangster No. 1
 Sexy Beast

References

External links
 
 
 
 
 44 Inch Chest at metacritic
 
 BBC Film Network – Malcolm Venville interview

2009 films
2000s crime drama films
Anonymous Content films
British crime drama films
Films shot at Elstree Film Studios
Films about kidnapping in the United Kingdom
Films set in London
Films produced by Steve Golin
2009 directorial debut films
2000s English-language films
Films directed by Malcolm Venville
2000s British films